Toccopola is a town in Pontotoc County, Mississippi, United States. The population was 246 at the 2010 census.

The town took its name from an old Indian village which once stood in the area; its name in turn is derived from the Chickasaw language purported to mean "dismal prairie".

Geography
Toccopola is located at  (34.255775, -89.234471).

Mississippi Highway 334 passes directly through Toccopola, connecting it with Oxford to the west, and Pontotoc to the east.

Demographics

As of the census of 2000, there were 189 people, 71 households, and 56 families residing in the town. The population density was 127.3 people per square mile (49.3/km2). There were 84 housing units at an average density of 56.6 per square mile (21.9/km2). The racial makeup of the town was 98.41% White, 0.53% African American, and 1.06% from two or more races.

There were 71 households, out of which 35.2% had children under the age of 18 living with them, 53.5% were married couples living together, 19.7% had a female householder with no husband present, and 21.1% were non-families. 19.7% of all households were made up of individuals, and 11.3% had someone living alone who was 65 years of age or older. The average household size was 2.66 and the average family size was 3.04.

In the town, the population was spread out, with 25.4% under the age of 18, 7.4% from 18 to 24, 29.1% from 25 to 44, 23.8% from 45 to 64, and 14.3% who were 65 years of age or older. The median age was 38 years. For every 100 females there were 96.9 males. For every 100 females age 18 and over, there were 104.3 males.

The median income for a household in the town was $20,625, and the median income for a family was $24,375. Males had a median income of $21,667 versus $24,688 for females. The per capita income for the town was $9,566. About 28.3% of families and 26.0% of the population were below the poverty line, including 36.7% of those under the age of eighteen and 28.6% of those 65 or over.

Education
The town of Toccopola is served by the Pontotoc County School District.

The University of Mississippi is located under 25 miles from Toccopola.

Notable people
 Harmonica Frank - Blues singer, guitarist, and harmonicist born in Toccopola.
 Elizabeth Love Allen - Advanced the 1839 Married Women's Property Act in Mississippi.  Died in Toccapola.

References

Towns in Pontotoc County, Mississippi